Sabkha Mosque is a Tunisian mosque in the south of the medina of Tunis in Bab Jaziza suburb.

Localization

It is located in 59 El Sabkha Street.

History
The mosque was built during the Hafsid era and then restored by the minister Youssef Saheb Ettabaa in 1813.

References

Mosques in Tunis